Alexandrovka is a rural locality (a selo) and the administrative center of Alexandrovskoye Rural Settlement, Ilovlinsky District, Volgograd Oblast, Russia. In 2010, the population was 855. There are seven streets.

Geography 
Alexandrovka is located in steppe, on the left bank of the Ilovlya River, on the Volga Upland, 44 km northeast of Ilovlya (the district's administrative centre) by road. Stefanidovka is the nearest rural locality.

References 

Rural localities in Ilovlinsky District
Tsaritsynsky Uyezd